Institute for America's Future was a progressive American think tank. The institute, a 501(c)(3) non-profit organization, has a sister organization called Campaign for America's Future which is a 501(c)(4) non-profit organization.

Activities
The Institute funded a website, TomPaine.com, which offers news, opinion and policy analysis from a progressive perspective.

The Institute established a joint project with the Center on Wisconsin Strategy called the Apollo Alliance, which is a 501(c)(3) think tank that deals with energy issues.

References

External links

Political and economic think tanks in the United States
501(c)(3) organizations